Nadia Navarro Acevedo is a Mexican politician from the National Action Party. From 2018 to 2021, she served as Senator of the LXIV Legislature of the Mexican Congress representing Puebla.

Early years
Navarro studied a law degree at the Escuela Libre de Derecho of Puebla and a master's degree in constitutional law and protection. From 2002 to 2004, she worked as a lawyer for the Mexican Social Security Institute (IMSS). From 2005 to 2007, she worked as a lawyer in the defense department of the Comptroller's Office of the municipality of Puebla de Zaragoza.

Political career
In 2014, Navarro was appointed as councilor of the municipality of Puebla de Zaragoza on behalf of the Social Pact of Integration party. In January 2017, she requested leave of absence from the position to join the team of Governor José Antonio Gali Fayad as head of the Poblano Institute for Women.

In the 2018 federal elections, Navarro was elected as the first minority senator of the National Action Party. From 1 September 2018 to 8 April 2021, she was a senator representing the state of Puebla in the LXIV Legislature of the Congress of the Union. Within the Senate, she served as secretary of the Governance Commission and the bicameral Commission of the Congressional Channel.

References

Date of birth missing (living people)
Living people
Politicians from Puebla
Women members of the Senate of the Republic (Mexico)
National Action Party (Mexico) politicians
21st-century Mexican politicians
21st-century Mexican women politicians
Senators of the LXIV and LXV Legislatures of Mexico
Year of birth missing (living people)
Escuela Libre de Derecho alumni
Members of the Senate of the Republic (Mexico) for Puebla